Aslauga marginalis, the western aslauga, is a butterfly in the family Lycaenidae. It is found in Sierra Leone, Liberia, Ivory Coast, Ghana, Togo, southern Nigeria and possibly western Cameroon. The habitat consists of open spaces in forests and on forest edges.

References

External links
Images representing Aslauga marginalis at Barcodes of Life

Butterflies described in 1890
Aslauga
Butterflies of Africa